The 1922 Irish general election took place in Southern Ireland on Friday, 16 June. The election was separately called by a resolution of Dáil Éireann on 19 May and by an order of the Provisional Government on 27 May. The body elected was thus both the Third Dáil and provisional parliament replacing the parliament of Southern Ireland, under the provisions of the 1921 Anglo-Irish Treaty to elect a constituent assembly paving the way for the formal establishment of the Irish Free State. From 6 December 1922, it continued as the Dáil Éireann of the Irish Free State.

The election was held under the electoral system of proportional representation by means of the single transferable vote. It was the first contested general election held in the jurisdiction using the STV system. The election was held in the 128 seats using the constituencies designated to the Southern Ireland House of Commons in the Government of Ireland Act 1920 (see Government of Ireland Act 1920 (constituencies).)

Campaign
In the 1921 elections, Sinn Féin had won all seats in uncontested elections, except for the four in the Dublin University constituency. On this occasion, however, most seats were contested. The treaty had divided the party between 65 pro-treaty candidates, 57 anti-treaty and 1 nominally on both sides. To minimise losses due to competition from other parties, Éamon de Valera and Michael Collins worked out a pact approved on 20 May 1922. They agreed that the pro-treaty and anti-treaty factions would fight the general election jointly and form a coalition government afterwards. The sitting member would not be opposed by the other faction. This pact prevented voters giving their opinions on the treaty itself, especially in uncontested seats. However, the draft Constitution of the Irish Free State was then published on 15 June, and so the anti-treaty Sinn Féin group's 36 seats out of 128 seemed to many to be a democratic endorsement of the pro-treaty Sinn Féin's arrangements. Others argued that insufficient time was available to understand the draft constitution, but the main arguments and debates had already been made public during and after the Dáil Treaty Debates that had ended on 10 January 1922, nearly six months before.

Winston Churchill, then Secretary of State for the Colonies, opposed the Pact as undemocratic, and made a long statement on 31 May. He was responsible at the time for steering the transitional arrangements between the Provisional Government and the government of the United Kingdom in the period between the ratification of the Treaty and the creation of the Irish Free State.

Despite the Pact, the election results started the effective division of Sinn Féin into separate parties. The anti-Treaty TDs then boycotted the new Dáil, even though they had requested, negotiated and approved the terms of the Pact. This boycott gave uncontested control to the pro-treaty members of Sinn Féin, and so enabled W. T. Cosgrave to establish the Second Provisional Government. The First Executive Council of the Irish Free State was appointed on 6 December 1922 on the nomination of this Dáil.

Result

|}

Many seats were won unopposed; 17 by Pro-Treaty Sinn Féin, 16 by Anti-Treaty Sinn Féin and 4 by independents.

Voting summary

Seats summary

Analysis
Out of a valid poll of 621,587 votes, the pro-Treaty faction of Sinn Féin won 239,195 votes and the anti-Treaty faction won 135,310 votes. The other parties and independents (see above) all supported the Treaty and secured a further 247,080 votes.

The vote was seen as significant in several ways:
The pro-Treaty parties had secured support from over 75% of the electorate on the eve of the Irish Civil War.
The non-Sinn Féin parties had support from over 40% of the electorate.

Further, the anti-Treaty candidates had taken part in an election in line with Article 11 of the Treaty, even though they had argued that it was flawed, being partitionist. Their pro-Treaty opponents argued that this revealed that their anti-Treaty stance was opportunist, and not principled. Article 11 of the Treaty had limited such an election to the constituencies of the formative Free State, and specifically excluded constituencies in Northern Ireland, yet the anti-Treaty argument was that the Dáil represented the whole island of Ireland.

Government formation
Within 12 days, on 28 June 1922, as a result of the tensions between pro- and anti-Treatyites, the Irish Civil War broke out, when the Provisional Government's troops began a bombardment of the Anti-Treaty IRA's occupation of the Four Courts, Dublin. The Dáil had been due to convene on 1 July, but its opening was prorogued on 5 occasions, meeting on 9 September 1922.

Michael Collins and Arthur Griffith, leaders of two separate but co-operating administrations, had respectively been killed and had died in August. On 9 September 1922, W. T. Cosgrave, leader of the pro-Treaty Sinn Féin TDs, was elected as President of Dáil Éireann and formed the 5th Ministry of Dáil Éireann.

On 6 December 1922, on the establishment of the Irish Free State, Cosgrave was nominated by the Dáil to the position of President of the Executive Council, and was appointed by the Governor-General Tim Healy. He formed the 1st Executive Council of the Irish Free State.

Change in membership
As each constituency was a multi-seat contest, rows represent changes in the constituency as a whole, rather than between individual TDs.

Change in affiliation
TD who contested 1922 election under a different affiliation to 1921.

See also
1922 United Kingdom general election in Northern Ireland - the first elections to Westminster after the ratification of the Anglo-Irish Treaty that did not include the territory that would become the Irish Free State.

References

1922 elections in Europe
General election, 1922
General election, 1922
1922
3rd Dáil
June 1922 events
General